Yngwie Johan Malmsteen (born Lars Johan Yngve Lannerbäck, 30 June 1963) is a Swedish guitarist. He first became known in the 1980s for his neoclassical playing style in heavy metal, and has released 22 studio albums in a career spanning over 40 years. In 2009, Time magazine rated Malmsteen as number 9 among the 11 greatest electric guitar players of all time.

Early life
Malmsteen was born Lars Johan Yngve Lannerbäck in Stockholm, Sweden, the third child of a musical family. At age 10, Malmsteen created his first band, Track on Earth, consisting of himself and a friend from school playing the drums. At age 12, he took his mother's maiden name Malmsten as his surname, then slightly changed it to Malmsteen and altered his third given name Yngve to "Yngwie". As a teenager he was heavily influenced by classical music, particularly 19th century Italian virtuoso violinist and composer Niccolò Paganini as well as Johann Sebastian Bach. During this time, he also discovered his most important guitar influence, Ritchie Blackmore. Malmsteen has stated that Jimi Hendrix had no musical impact on him and did not contribute to his style. However watching the TV news reports on 18 September 1970 of Hendrix's death, which included footage of Hendrix smashing and burning his guitar at the Monterey Pop Festival of 1967, made Malmsteen think, "This is really cool."

Career

1980s 
In early 1982, Mike Varney of Shrapnel Records, who had heard a demo tape of Malmsteen's playing from the 1978 demo titled Powerhouse, brought Malmsteen to the United States. He played briefly with the band Steeler on its 1983 self-titled album. He then appeared with Graham Bonnet in the band Alcatrazz, playing on its 1983 debut No Parole from Rock 'n' Roll and the 1984 live album Live Sentence. Bonnet and Malmsteen clashed about who was the frontman and had a fight during a show. Malmsteen was fired on the spot from Alcatrazz and replaced by Steve Vai. Vai had one day to learn the songs for the ongoing tour. In 1984, Malmsteen released his first solo album Rising Force, which featured Barrie Barlow of Jethro Tull on drums and keyboard player Jens Johansson. His album was meant to be an instrumental side-project of Alcatrazz, but it ended up featuring vocals by Jeff Scott Soto and Malmsteen left Alcatrazz soon after the release of Rising Force.

Rising Force won the Guitar Players award for Best Rock Album and was nominated for a Grammy Award for 'Best Rock Instrumental', reaching no. 60 on the Billboard album chart. Yngwie J. Malmsteen's Rising Force (as his band was thereafter known) next released Marching Out (1985). Then he recruited Jens Johansson's brother Anders to play drums and bassist Marcel Jacob to record and tour with the band. Jacob left in the middle of a tour and was replaced by Wally Voss. Malmsteen's third album, Trilogy, featuring the vocals of Mark Boals (and Malmsteen on both guitar and bass), was released in 1986. Boals left the band in the middle of the tour and was replaced by the former singer Jeff Scott Soto. The tour was cancelled after Malmsteen was involved in a serious car accident, smashing his V12 Jaguar E-Type into a tree, which put him in a coma for a week. Nerve damage to his right hand was reported. During this time, Malmsteen's mother died from cancer. New line-up changes for the next album with former Rainbow vocalist Joe Lynn Turner joined the band, along with session bassist Bob Daisley, who was hired to record some bass parts and help with the lyrics. In April 1988, he released his fourth album Odyssey. Odyssey was his most successful album, in part due to the success of its first single "Heaven Tonight". Shows in the Soviet Union during the Odyssey tour were recorded and released in 1989 as a fifth album Trial by Fire: Live in Leningrad. The classic Rising Force line-up with Malmsteen and the Johansson brothers was dissolved in 1989 when both Anders and Jens left. That year later, Jens joined Dio replacing keyboardist Claude Schnell.

Malmsteen's neoclassical style of metal became popular among hordes of guitarists during the mid-1980s, with contemporaries such as Jason Becker, Paul Gilbert, Tony MacAlpine, and Vinnie Moore becoming prominent. In late 1988, Malmsteen's signature Fender Stratocaster guitar was released, making him and Eric Clapton the first artists to be honored by Fender.

 1990s 
In the early 1990s, Malmsteen released two albums, Eclipse (1990) and Fire & Ice (1992), with the singer Göran Edman, followed by The Seventh Sign (1994) and Magnum Opus (1995) with former Loudness singer Mike Vescera. Despite his early and continuous success in Europe and Asia, by the early 1990s heavy metal styles such as neoclassical metal and shredding had gone out of fashion in the US.

Around 1993, Malmsteen's future mother-in-law – who opposed his engagement to her daughter – had him arrested for allegedly holding her daughter hostage with a gun. The charges were later dropped. Malmsteen continued to record and release albums under the Japanese record label Pony Canyon and maintained a devoted following with fans in Europe and Japan and to a lesser extent in the US.

In the mid 1990s, Malmsteen released the albums Inspiration (1996) featuring three of his former singers Soto, Boals and Turner, Facing the Animal (1997) featuring Mats Levén on vocals and Cozy Powell on drums, followed by a live record Double Live! (1998) and another studio recording Alchemy (1999) featuring once again Mark Boals on vocals.

Special guest appearances and side projects
In 1996, Malmsteen joined forces with former band members Jeff Scott Soto and Marcel Jacob on the "Human Clay" album where he played lead guitar on the track "Jealousy". In the same year, Yngwie recorded guitar solos for two different Deep Purple tribute albums, "Smoke on the Water" and "Black Night – Deep Purple Tribute According to New York" on the last one using the alias "Lars Y. Loudamp" to avoid contractual conflicts. He also guested with Saxon on the song Denim And Leather on their live album The Eagle Has Landed – Part II (released in 1997). Later that year, Yngwie recorded the tracks "Enigma suite" and "All opposable thumbs" with his former band members Jens Johansson and Anders Johansson on their album Johansson/Sonic Winter.

2000s

In 2000, he signed a contract with the US record label Spitfire and released his 1990s catalog on the US market for the first time, including what he regards as his masterpiece, Concerto Suite for Electric Guitar and Orchestra, recorded with the Czech Philharmonic in Prague.

After the release of War to End All Wars in 2000, singer Mark Boals left the band. He was replaced by former Rainbow vocalist Doogie White, whose vocals were well received by fans. In 2003, Malmsteen joined Joe Satriani and Steve Vai as part of the G3 supergroup, a tour showcasing guitar performances. Malmsteen made two guest appearances on keyboardist Derek Sherinian's albums Black Utopia (2003), and Blood of the Snake (2006) where Malmsteen plays on the same tracks as Al Di Meola and Zakk Wylde. In 2004, Malmsteen made two cameo appearances on Harvey Birdman, Attorney at Law. In 2005 Unleash the Fury was released through Spitfire Records. As stated in an issue of "Guitar World" magazine, he titled this album after an infamous 'airline incident', which occurred on a flight to Japan during a 1988 tour. He was drunk and behaving obnoxiously, until he fell asleep and was roused by a woman pouring a jug of iced water on him. Enraged, he shouted, "You've released the fucking fury!" The audio from this incident was caught on tape by a fellow band member. Malmsteen says that the name of the album refers to both the energy of the album and the incident. The release of Unleash the Fury was followed by a DVD release of Concerto Suite For Electric Guitar And Orchestra in E Flat Minor, Op. 1 – With The New Japan Philharmonic Live. The DVD chronicles Malmsteen's first time playing in front of a live audience with an orchestra, an experience that he describes as "fun but also extremely scary".

In 2007, Malmsteen was honored in the Xbox 360 version of Guitar Hero II. Players can receive the "Yngwie Malmsteen" award by hitting 1000 or more notes in succession. February 2008 saw the replacement of singer Doogie White with former Iced Earth and Judas Priest and current Beyond Fear singer Tim "Ripper" Owens, with whom Malmsteen had once recorded a cover of Ozzy Osbourne's song "Mr. Crowley", for the 2000 Osbourne tribute album Bat Head Soup: A Tribute to Ozzy. The first Malmsteen album to feature Owens is titled Perpetual Flame and was released on 4 October. On 25 November 2008, Malmsteen had three of his songs ("Caprici Di Diablo", "Damnation Game", and "Red Devil", all from this latter album) released as downloadable content for the video games Rock Band Rock Band 2 and later Rock Band 3.

In 2008, Malmsteen was a special guest on the VH1 Classic show "That Metal Show". On 10 March 2009, Malmsteen's label Rising Force released Angels of Love, an all-instrumental album, which featured acoustic arrangements of some of his best-known ballads. In August 2009, Time magazine named Malmsteen No. 9 on its list of the 10 best electric guitar players of all-time. Malmsteen recently released another album compilation entitled High Impact on 8 December 2009.

2010–present

On 23 November 2010, Relentless was released, the second album to feature Tim "Ripper" Owens on vocals. The US version featured a remake of "Arpeggios From Hell" as a bonus track. Yngwie appeared on Late Night with Jimmy Fallon on 3 February 2011 to promote his album. On 6 August 2011, Malmsteen made another appearance in the United States, playing a rendition of "The Star-Spangled Banner" before a game between the St. Louis Cardinals and Florida Marlins at Sun Life Stadium. Although rarely seen in his native country of Sweden, Malmsteen played one gig there in 2012. On 7 July, he ended the Getaway Rock Festival in Gävle, which he was headlining with Nightwish and Manowar. On 5 December 2012, Malmsteen released the album Spellbound. 2013 saw the release of Yngwie's official autobiography Relentless.

On 12 June 2014, Malmsteen kicked off his "Guitar Gods 2014 Tour" at the F.M. Kirby Center in Wilkes-Barre, Pennsylvania alongside ex-Guns N' Roses guitarist Bumblefoot and guitarist Gary Hoey. In February 2015, it was announced that Malmsteen was in the studio working on a new album. In April and May 2016, Malmsteen was one of five guitarists featured on the Generation Axe tour.

In 2018, it was announced that Malmsteen had signed with Mascot Records, with a new studio album expected the following year. In 2019, Malmsteen released Blue Lightning, featuring blues rock songs – mainly covers – with Malmsteen's virtuoso playing. As Malmsteen was quoted: 

On 8 May 2021, Yngwie Malmsteen was reported to have launched the Parabellum album and video for the "Paganini-referencing" track "Wolves at the Door". Since COVID-19 restrictions prevented touring, Malmsteen had more time to record the album, and was "clearly delighted with the results."

Personal life
Malmsteen was married to Swedish singer Erika Norberg (1991-1992) and was subsequently married to Amber Dawn Landin (1993-1998). Since 1999 he has been married to April Malmsteen, with whom he has a son named Antonio, after Antonio Vivaldi. The family now resides in Miami Shores, Florida.

A Ferrari enthusiast, Malmsteen owned a black 1983 308 GTS for 24 years before selling it on eBay, and a red 1962 250 GTO.

In a 2005 issue of Guitar Player magazine, Malmsteen discussed his often-ridiculed behaviour, saying that, "I've probably made more mistakes than anybody. But I don't dwell on them. I don't expect people to understand me, because I'm pretty complex, and I think outside the box with everything I do. I've always taken the untraveled path. Obviously, people have their opinions, but I can't get too wrapped up in that, because I know what I can do, and I know what kind of person I am. And I have no control over what anybody says about me. Back in Sweden, I'm 'Mr Personality' in the tabloids, but obviously I can't take that seriously. I know in my heart that if I do the absolute best I can do, maybe ten years from now people may turn around and say, 'he wasn't that bad'."

Equipment
Yngwie Malmsteen Signature Stratocaster
 	

Malmsteen has been a longtime user of Fender Stratocasters with DiMarzio HS3 single-coil pickups "for playing at blistering volume with no hum or screechiness". His most famous Stratocaster is his 1972 blonde Stratocaster, nicknamed "The Duck" because of its yellow finish and the Donald Duck stickers on the headstock. An alternative nickname for this guitar is "Play Loud" due to a sticker that Anders Johansson put on the upper horn of the guitar in Rockshire studios in 1984. Fender made 100 replica copies of this guitar and marketed it as the "Play Loud Guitar". He also has a Fender Yngwie Malmsteen Signature Stratocaster since 1986. It comes in a Vintage White finish with a maple neck, either a maple or rosewood fretboard with scalloped frets and, from 2010, Seymour Duncan STK-S10 YJM "Fury" Model pickups. There is also a signature YJM100 Marshall amplifier, based on the "1959" amplifier range.

 Other guitars 
Besides Stratocasters, Malmsteen has played and appeared in ads for non-Fender guitars (like Aria Pro II and Schecter in the early 1980s) and played non-Strat-shaped guitars (like Gibson Flying Vs), early in his career. Today, for acoustic and nylon string guitars, Malmsteen uses his signature Ovation YM68s.

 Band members Current members'''
Yngwie Malmsteen – guitars, vocals (1978–1982, 1984–present)
Nick Marino – keyboards, vocals (2005–2006, 2010–present)
Emilio Martinez – bass, vocals (2017–present)
Brian Wilson – drums (2018–present)

Discography
Steeler

 Alcatrazz 
Studio albums

Live albums

 Videos 

 Metallic Live (1984, VHS)
 Alcatrazz Live Sentence 1984 (2010, DVD Reissue)

 G3 
Live albums

VideosG3: Live in Denver (2004)

Solo
Studio albums

Live albums

Compilations

EP

Videos

Music videos
Island in the Sun (1983) (with Alcatrazz)
Hiroshima Mon Amour (1983) (with Alcatrazz)
I'll See the Light Tonight (1985)
We're Stars (1986) (with Hear 'N Aid)
You Don't Remember, I'll Never Forget (1986)
Heaven Tonight (1988)
Making Love (1990)
Save Our Love (1990)
Bedroom Eyes (1990)
Teaser (1992)
Dragonfly (1992)
Forever One (1994)
The Only One (1995)
Carry On Wayward Son (Kansas Cover) (1996)
Alone in Paradise (1997)
Like an Angel (1997)
Hanger 18, Area 51 (1999)
Crucify (2000)

Guest appearances

See also
 Guitar showmanship
 Shred guitar
 Sweep picking

References

Further reading
 Malmsteen, Yngwie (2013). Relentless''. Wiley. .

External links

 
 Audio interview with Yngwie // Metalpaths.com 2010 
 Audio Interview with Yngwie on GuitarJamDaily.com 
 HardRadio.com interview with Yngwie
 NAMM Oral History Interview 18 January 2008

1963 births
Living people
Swedish expatriates in the United States
American people of Swedish descent
Swedish bandleaders
Alcatrazz members
G3 (tour)
Generation Axe members
Steeler (American band) members
Swedish male guitarists
Lead guitarists
Swedish heavy metal guitarists
Swedish rock guitarists
Swedish male composers
Swedish record producers
Yngwie J. Malmsteen's Rising Force members